Andrew Ball is a New Zealand sailor. He won a silver medal at the 1994 World Championships in sailing (keelboat classes).

References

Year of birth missing (living people)
New Zealand male sailors (sport)
Living people
Place of birth missing (living people)